Halldór or Halldor is a given name. Notable people with the name include:

Halldór Ásgrímsson (born 1947), Icelandic politician, formerly Prime Minister of Iceland from 2004 to 2006
Halldór Orri Björnsson (born 1987), Icelandic international footballer
Halldór Blöndal (born 1938), politician of the Independence Party (Iceland)
Lárus Halldór Grímsson (born 1954), Icelandic composer and musician
Halldór Guðmundsson (born 1956), Icelandic author
Halldór Helgason (born 1991), Icelandic professional snowboarder
Jón Halldór Kristjánsson (born 1942), Icelandic politician and former Minister of Social Affairs
Halldór Laxness (1902–1998), Icelandic novelist and author of Independent People, The Atom Station, and Iceland's Bell
Halldór Eggert Sigurðsson (1915–2003), Icelandic politician and former minister
Halldor Skard (born 1973), former Norwegian Nordic combined skier who competed from 1990 to 2000

See also
Halldóra, the feminine form
Haldor

Icelandic masculine given names